Pool game may refer to:

 A game (in the sense of a defined set of rules) in the pool (pocket billiards) family of cue sports
 A game played in a swimming pool
 A video game that is a sports simulator of pool (pocket billiards)

See also 
 A Game of Pool (disambiguation)